Kaitak, Kajtak, or Kaitag may refer to the following topics associated with a region in Dagestan, Russia:

 Kaitag State, a historic principality
 Kaytagsky District, the current administrative unit
 Kaitags, an ethnic group
 Kaitak language, of the Northeast Caucasian family
 Kaitag dialect, of the Turkic Kumyk language
 Kaitag dialect, of the Indo-European Judeo-Tat language
 Kaitag textiles, a form of embroidery

See also 
 Kai Tak (disambiguation), several places in Hong Kong, including its former airport

Language and nationality disambiguation pages